Greatest Hits: Time & Again, also called Greatest Hits, is a 2001 compilation album by Christian singer-songwriter Twila Paris released on Sparrow Records. This collection includes three brand new songs and fifteen previously released songs from her Benson, Star Song and Sparrow albums, including "Destiny" from Paris' 1992 compilation album A Heart That Knows You and "The Time Is Now" from her 1995 EP of the same name. The new tracks were produced by Mark Hammond. The album peaked at number 21 on the Billboard Top Christian Albums chart.

Track listing 
All songs written by Twila Paris, except where noted.

Personnel 

On the new recordings:
 Twila Paris – lead and all vocals
 Mark Hammond – programming, arrangements
 Micah Wilshire – electric guitar (tracks 4 and 18)
 David Cleveland – acoustic guitar (tracks 4 and 10)

Production 

 Mark Hammond – producer
 Lynn Nichols – executive producer
 Ronnie Brookshire – recording 
 Todd Robbins – recording 
 David Dillbeck – recording 
 The Rec Room, Nashville, Tennessee – recording location 
 Reid Shippen – mixing at Recording Arts Studios, Nashville, Tennessee 
 Mike Shike – assistant mixing 
 Steve Hall – mastering at Future Disc, Hollywood, California
 Jan Cook – art direction
 Philpott Design – design
 Christiév Carothers – creative director
 Russ Harrington – cover photo
 Michael Tighe – additional photography

Additional production
 Jonathan David Brown – producer (tracks 2, 3, 6, 7, 13 – 15)
 Brown Bannister – producer (tracks 1, 9, 11, 16)
 Charlie Peacock – producer (track 8)
 Richard Souther – producer (track 5)
 Paul Mills – producer (tracks 1, 17)
 Darrell A. Harris – executive producer (track 12)
 Daniel D. McGuffey – executive producer (track 12)

Charts

References 

2001 greatest hits albums
Twila Paris albums
Sparrow Records compilation albums